A real time clock alarm is a feature that can be used to allow a computer to 'wake up' after shut down to execute tasks every day or on a certain day. It can sometimes be found in the 'Power Management' section of a motherboard's BIOS/UEFI setup. Wake On LAN, Wake on ring, and IPMI functions could also be used to start a computer after it is turned off.

In Linux, the real time clock alarm can be set or retrieved using /proc/acpi/alarm or /sys/class/rtc/rtc0/wakealarm. Alternatively the rtcwake utility may be used which prevents problems when using local time instead of UTC by automatically processing the /etc/adjtime file. systemd can be used to wake a system and run a task at a specific time.

In Microsoft Windows there are different programs which could be used to 'wake up' a computer from standby or hibernation. Task Scheduler settings for power management can be used to 'Wake the computer to run this task'.

References

See also 
 Alert on LAN
 Wake-on-Ring (WOR)
 Wired for Management
 Wake-on-LAN

Alarms
Alarm
Operating system technology
BIOS
Unified Extensible Firmware Interface